The Connecticut Senate election, 2006 was held on November 7, 2006 to elect Senators to the Connecticut State Senate for the term which began in January 2007 and ended in January 2009. It occurred on the same date as other federal and state elections, including the state's gubernatorial election.

The election saw the election or re-election of 24 Democrats and 12 Republicans to fill the Senate's 36 seats. The incumbent party in each district held onto control of their respective seats in the election, except for two seats which changed control – one from Democratic to Republican, and one from Republican to Democratic.

Results
Results of the 2006 Connecticut Senate election. Party shading denotes winner of Senate seat.

Notes
TP Denotes that a minor, third party candidate also ran in this district's election.

RWI Denotes that a registered write-in candidate was also present in this district's election. However, all write-ins received no votes in their respective district’s election, except for 13 received in the 35th District.

WF Denotes that this candidate also ran on the line of the Connecticut Working Families Party. The vote percentage won by this candidate includes both their Working Families and their party of affiliation figures combined.

I Denotes that this candidate also ran on the independent line. The vote percentage won by this candidate includes both their independent and their party of affiliation figures combined.

References

2006 Connecticut elections
2006
Connecticut Senate